Christa Kabitz Sommer (May 21, 1918 – April 21, 2011) was a German-born, Washington artist whose five-decade long career was featured worldwide (Berlin, Frankfurt, Heidelberg, Prague, Washington (Corcoran's select 6th Annual Area Exhibition), New York and Chicago). Frustrated with her art education at Breslau Academy of Art, in 1940 she trained under Max Friese, crediting him with her success. She was commissioned to paint Prince Alexander of Prussia, Baroness Wedell, Judge Wawersig, Professor Kruger, Freiherr von Berlichingen and family, Prince Hohenlohe, Professor Giese, Hermann Schomberg (as Goetz von Berlichingen). Following World War II she taught at the Masters School in Offenbach, In 1951 she was sponsored by Lieutenant General Withers Alexander Burress to move to the US to advance her career where she was commissioned for the portraits of Madame Nicole Alphand, Pierre Landy, Madame Oreamuno, Mrs. Kvarness, the Audley children, Mrs. Olga Foley, Tiger Reviere, Trudy Davis, Georgetown Law School Professors, Sandra Day O'Connor, Johnny Carson, Marvin Mitchelson, Arthur Miller, Clara Mortensen Beyer. She studied and taught at the Catholic University, the Corcoran School of Art, and American University.

References

1918 births
2011 deaths
German emigrants to the United States
American women painters
20th-century American painters
20th-century American women artists
21st-century American women